Ballenger Creek is a  tributary of the Monocacy River in Frederick County, Maryland. The stream runs roughly southeast to the Monocacy National Battlefield and the confluence with the Monocacy River, which drains to the Potomac River.

See also
List of Maryland rivers

References

External links
Ballenger Creek Stream Corridor Assessment Survey (2005) – Maryland Department of Natural Resources & Frederick County
Monocacy & Catoctin Watershed Alliance

Rivers of Frederick County, Maryland
Rivers of Maryland
Tributaries of the Monocacy River